Bulbophyllum boonjee commonly known as the maroon strand orchid,  is a species of epiphytic orchid that is endemic to tropical North Queensland. It has crowded, flattened pseudobulbs, stiff, pale green leaves and up to four small, bell-shaped maroon flowers with darker stripes.

Description
Flowering occurs between September and February.

Taxonomy and naming
Bulbophyllum boonjee was first formally described in 1984 by Bruce Gray and David Jones and published The Orchadian.

Distribution and habitat
The maroon strand orchid grows on thin branches of rainforest trees on the Atherton Tableland and Mount Lewis in Queensland.

Conservation
This orchid is classed as "vulnerable" under the Queensland Government Nature Conservation Act 1992.

References

boonjee
Orchids of Queensland
Endemic orchids of Australia
Plants described in 1984